St. Nilus Monastery,  founded in 1999, is a woman's monastic institution of the Serbian Orthodox Church in North and South America, situated on Nelson Island in the Ouzinkie Narrow Straits in Alaska, less than an hour's boat ride from Kodiak Island. Many Orthodox monasteries are off the beaten track, however, St. Nilus Monastery is obviously the remotest of all 80 American Orthodox Christian monasteries in North America. The inlet, owned by the monastery, is void of any other settlement. In the winter months, St. Nilus Monastery and the four nuns there can be left desolate from the rest of civilization for days and weeks at a time.

The small community is affiliated with St. Archangel Michael Skete in Alaska and two other monasteries in California, St. Xenia Serbian Orthodox Monastery and the Saint Herman of Alaska Monastery, but only St. Archangel Michael Skete is close to St. Nilus Monastery.

The handful of nuns living at the monastery — across Narrow Strait from the northeast tip of Kodiak Island — use a small boat to get to and from their abode to buy necessary supplies. Throughout the summer when days are longer and the seas are calm, the boat brings women pilgrims to the island, and those wishing to stay longer are put up in the guest-house.

The monastic community, like the affiliated ones, is under the omophorion of Bishop Maksim Vasiljević of the Serbian Orthodox Eparchy of Western America. The women strugglers follow the Russian monastic tradition of a small, self-sufficient skete, a model handed down by their Patron St. Nilus of Sora and others. The sisters generally follow the complete daily cycle of services and support themselves through making vestments, prayer ropes, greeting cards of Alaskan Saints, fishing, gardening, and cooking. They are obliged by Orthodox canons to offer hospitality to their non-cleric guests as though they are one of them. Visitors are welcome for the traditional three-day period, and accommodations can be made for female pilgrims to stay longer.

See also
 St. Sava Serbian Orthodox Monastery, located at the Episcopal headquarters of the Serbian Orthodox Eparchy of Eastern America, Libertyville, Illinois
 New Gračanica Monastery, located at the Episcopal headquarters of the Serbian Orthodox Eparchy of New Gračanica and Midwestern America, Third Lake, Illinois
 Episcopal headquarters of the Serbian Orthodox Eparchy of Western America, located at Saint Steven's Serbian Orthodox Cathedral, Alhambra, California
 Holy Transfiguration Serbian Orthodox Monastery, Milton, Ontario, Canada
 Episcopal headquarters of the Serbian Orthodox Eparchy of Buenos Aires and South America, Buenos Aires, Argentina
 Monastery of St. Paisius, Safford
 St. Pachomious Monastery
 St. Archangel Michael Skete
 Saint Herman of Alaska Monastery
 St. Mark Serbian Orthodox Monastery

References

External links
 Orthodoxwiki: https://orthodoxwiki.org/St._Nilus_Island_Skete

Sketes
Convents in the United States
Eastern Orthodoxy in Alaska
Serbian Orthodox monasteries in the United States
Buildings and structures in Bethel Census Area, Alaska
1999 establishments in Alaska